The  is an electric multiple unit (EMU) train type operated by the private railway operator Nishi-Nippon Railroad (Nishitetsu) in Japan on the Nishitetsu Tenjin Ōmuta Line since 20 March 2017.

Design
The 9000 series trains were built by Kawasaki Heavy Industries in Kobe, with two three-car sets and two two-car sets (10 vehicles) entering service in March 2017, and a further two three-car sets and one two-car set (eight vehicles) entering service in May 2017.

Based on the earlier 3000 series trains, externally, the new trains carry a livery with a "royal red" waist-line stripe.

Operations
The 9000 series trains operate on Nishitetsu Tenjin Ōmuta Line express and all-stations local services.

Formations

2-car sets
The two-car sets are formed as follows with one motored ("M") car and one non-powered trailer ("T") car.

The motored car has two single-arm pantographs.

3-car sets
The three-car sets are formed as follows with one motored ("M") car and two non-powered trailer ("T") cars.

The motored car has two single-arm pantographs.

Interior

LED lighting is used in the interiors, and two 17-inch LCD passenger information screens are provided above each of the doorways with information provided in four different languages (Japanese, English, Korean, and Chinese).

History
Details of the new trains were officially announced in February 2016. The first two trains (one three-car and one two-car set) entered revenue service on 20 March 2017.

References

External links

 Nishitetsu 9000 series information 
 Kawasaki Heavy Industries news release 

Electric multiple units of Japan
Nishi-Nippon Railroad
Train-related introductions in 2017
Kawasaki multiple units
1500 V DC multiple units of Japan